Charles Bridges may refer to:
Charles Bridges (theologian) (1794–1869), preacher and theologian in the Church of England
Charles Bridges (painter) (1672–1747), English painter active in the American colonies
Charles Bridges (politician) (1881–1955), Australian politician
Charles Scott Bridges (1903–1961), American corporate executive
Charles Higbee Bridges (1873–1948), officer in the United States Army

See also
Charles Bridge, a bridge in Prague, Czech Republic